The Garst House, also known as the Garst Museum, is an historic building located at 205 North Broadway in Greenville, Ohio, United States.  On November 16, 1977, it was added to the National Register of Historic Places.
Today it is a local history museum operated by the Darke County Historical Society.

Museum
The Garst Museum contains exhibits about Annie Oakley, Lowell Thomas, Native American culture, local military activities, pioneer life and prehistory.  There is also a display of two streets of old village shops. America is presented through a wide range of artifacts.  There is a Treaty room with over 1,000 artifacts, including the Treaty of Green Ville. The Lowell Thomas Birthplace was moved to the museum grounds and is open on weekends in the summer. The museum also features a genealogy library operated by the Darke County Genealogical Society and a gift shop.

References

External links 
Museum website

Houses on the National Register of Historic Places in Ohio
Houses completed in 1852
Buildings and structures in Greenville, Ohio
Museums in Darke County, Ohio
History museums in Ohio
Biographical museums in Ohio
Houses in Darke County, Ohio
National Register of Historic Places in Darke County, Ohio
1852 establishments in Ohio